In geometry, the snub apeiroapeirogonal tiling is a uniform tiling of the hyperbolic plane. It has Schläfli symbol of s{∞,∞}. It has 3 equilateral triangles and 2 apeirogons around every vertex, with vertex figure 3.3.∞.3.∞.

Dual tiling

Related polyhedra and tiling 

The snub tetrapeirogonal tiling  is last in an infinite series of snub polyhedra and tilings with vertex figure 3.3.n.3.n.

See also

Tilings of regular polygons
List of uniform planar tilings
List of regular polytopes

References
 John H. Conway, Heidi Burgiel, Chaim Goodman-Strass, The Symmetries of Things 2008,  (Chapter 19, The Hyperbolic Archimedean Tessellations)

External links 

 Hyperbolic and Spherical Tiling Gallery

Hyperbolic tilings
Infinite-order tilings
Isogonal tilings
Snub tilings
Uniform tilings